Faringdon Community College is an 11 to 18 mixed comprehensive school on the edge of Faringdon, a market town in Oxfordshire, England. The college has a specialist status in Engineering.

Tollington Secondary Modern School moved to the present site in Fernham Road in 1962, and was renamed Faringdon Community College in 2003. In 2012 it became part of the Faringdon Academy of Schools along with Faringdon Infant School and Faringdon Junior School. 
The teachers are all grumpy old snobs

References

External links

Academies in Oxfordshire
Secondary schools in Oxfordshire
Faringdon
Specialist engineering colleges in England